The Bebe mormyrid (Hyperopisus bebe) is a species of elephantfish in the family Mormyridae. It is the only species in its genus and is divided into two subspecies. This species is known from many rivers in the northern half of Africa, ranging from the Senegal to the Nile basin.

Biology
The Bebe morymid inhabits both still and flowing bodies of water. The species' diet consists mainly of mollusks. It possesses electroreceptors over its head and on the ventral and dorsal regions of the body, but they are absent from the side and the caudal peduncle where the electric organ is located.

Subspecies 

 Hyperopisus bebe bebe (Lacépède 1803)
 Hyperopisus bebe occidentalis Günther 1866

References 

Weakly electric fish
Mormyridae
Monotypic ray-finned fish genera
Fish described in 1803